Mania is a given name and a surname. It may refer to:

Mania (queen), a 4th-century BC satrap (governor) of Dardanus
Mavia (queen) (died 425), an Arab warrior-queen whose name is sometimes given as Mania
Mania Akbari (born 1974), Iranian film director
Adam Mania (born 1983), Olympic swimmer
Ryan Mania (born 1989), Scottish jockey